Javornik Falls is a series of three waterfalls near the settlement of Javorniški Rovt, part of the municipality of Jesenice in northern Slovenia.

The individually unnamed falls occur in the upper course of Javornik Creek, at an elevation of approximately 950 m in the foothills of the Karawanks. They vary from 5 to 10 m in height, and are accessible to hikers from the Gajšek Trail leading from the Kres recreation area above the village of Koroška Bela to the Pristava Lodge.

References 

Municipality of Jesenice
Waterfalls of Slovenia